Juhani Wallenius (7 February 1956 – 27 February 2014) was a Finnish ice hockey forward who mainly played for Rauman Lukko.

In Finland, Wallenius played in the SM-Liiga (Finnish Elite League) and SM-sarja (Finnish Championship Series). He was selected by the St. Louis Blues in the 1976 NHL Amateur Draft, and the Phoenix Roadrunners in the 1976 WHA Amateur Draft, but never moved to North America.

Career 
Wallenius played 330 games in Liiga and put up 305 points, he is considered as a cult player for Lukko.

References

External links
 

1956 births
2014 deaths
Finnish ice hockey forwards
Lukko players
Ässät players
St. Louis Blues draft picks
Phoenix Roadrunners draft picks
People from Rauma, Finland
Sportspeople from Satakunta